Frankston High School is a public high school located in Frankston, Texas. It is part of the Frankston Independent School District located in northeastern Anderson County and classified as a 2A school by the UIL. In 2013, the school was rated "Met Standard" by the Texas Education Agency.

Athletics
Frankston High School participates in the following sports 

Baseball
Basketball
Cross Country
Football
Golf
Powerlifting
Softball
Track and Field
Volleyball

State Title
Boys Basketball 
1961(1A)

References

External links
Frankston Independent School District

Schools in Anderson County, Texas
Public high schools in Texas